Euphyes pilatka, the Palatka skipper or saw-grass skipper, is a butterfly of the family Hesperiidae. It is found in the United States from southeastern Virginia south to peninsular Florida and the Florida Keys, then west along the Gulf Coast to southern Mississippi. Strays can be found up to northern Maryland and southwestern Louisiana.

The wingspan is 45–54 mm. The upperside is orange with black borders and the underside of the hindwings is dull brown. They feed on the flower nectar of various plants, including Pontederia species.

The larvae feed on the leaves of Cladium jamaicensis. They live in shelters of rolled leaves.

Subspecies
Euphyes pilatka pilatka
Euphyes pilatka klotsi L. Miller, Harvey & J. Miller, 1985 (Florida Keys)

References

Butterflies described in 1867
Hesperiini
Butterflies of North America